Bartail may refer to:

 Bartail flathead, a bottom-dwelling fish
 Bartail jawfish, a mouthbrooding fish
 Bartail spurdog, a dogfish shark

See also

 Bar-tailed (disambiguation)